P. T. Punnoose (20 November 1911 – 1971) was an Indian politician. He was elected to the Lok Sabha, the lower house of the Parliament of India from the Ambalapuzha in Kerala.

Early life and education
P.T Punnoose was born on 20 November 1911 at Thiruvalla in Travancore. His father was I. Thomas. He was educated at Changanacherry and Trivandrum.

Marriage and children
P.T. Punnoose married Rosamma Punnoos who was a Catholic and later leader of the Communist Party of India (CPI), in 1946. Punnoose was a Marthoma Syrian. No marriage between a Catholic woman and a Marthoma man had ever occurred in the region, at the time. Besides which, Rosamma's family supported the Indian National Congress, and objected to her marrying a communist. Furthermore, he was wanted by police and authorities who were conducting a crackdown against communists at the time. As with all Christian weddings between communist couples, at the time, the two were married at a church in Cochin with a special letter of consent from the Pope. He had to be brought to the church quietly to evade to police. They have two children a daughter and son.

Political view
P.T. Punnoose was one of the early leaders of communist movement in Kerala. He had started his political career at Congress during the time of freedom struggle. He was attracted to ideologies of Communist Party of India. He remained in the CPI after the historical split in 1964.

See also
List of members of the 1st Lok Sabha
List of members of the 2nd Lok Sabha

References

Communist Party of India politicians from Kerala
20th-century Indian politicians
1911 births
1971 deaths
Indian independence activists from Kerala
Kingdom of Travancore
India MPs 1957–1962